Puthiya Velicham is a 1979 Indian Malayalam-language film, directed by Sreekumaran Thampi and produced by S. Kumar. The film stars Jayan, Jayabharathi, Srividya and Jagathy Sreekumar. It is a remake of the Hindi film Phool Aur Patthar.

Plot

Cast 

 Jayan as Venu
 Jose Prakash as John
 Jayabharathi as Lilli
 Srividya as Lakshmi
 Jagathy Sreekumar as Parippi vada
 Thikkurissy Sukumaran Nair as Lohithakshan Bagavathar
 Janardhanan
 Hari as Inspector Viswambaran
 Sankaradi as Panikkar
 Philomina as Althara Amma
 Lissy
 Sreelatha Namboothiri as Sindhu Bhairavi
 Meena
 Poojappura Ravi as Vaidhyar Keshavan Nair
 Master Raghu as Kochu Govindhan
 Usha Kumari as Dancer
 Jayamalini as Dancer
 Javadevi as Dancer
 Arur Sathyan
 Vijayaraj
 Jaggu
 Haripad Soman
 Aravindhakshan
 Gandhikuttan
 Sethu
 Radhakrishnan

Soundtrack 
The music was composed by Salil Chowdhury, with lyrics by Sreekumaran Thampi.

Box office 
The film was commercial success.

References

External links 
 

1970s Malayalam-language films
1979 films
Films directed by Sreekumaran Thampi
Films scored by Salil Chowdhury
Malayalam remakes of Hindi films